Agrophysics is a branch of science bordering on agronomy and physics,
whose objects of study are the agroecosystem - the biological objects, biotope and biocoenosis affected by human activity, studied and described using the methods of physical sciences.  Using the achievements of the exact sciences to solve major problems in agriculture, agrophysics involves the study of materials and processes occurring in the production and processing of agricultural crops, with particular emphasis on the condition of the environment and the quality of farming materials and food production.

Agrophysics is closely related to biophysics, but is restricted to the physics of the plants, animals, soil and an atmosphere involved in agricultural activities and biodiversity. It is different from biophysics in having the necessity of taking into account the specific features of biotope and biocoenosis, which involves the knowledge of nutritional science and agroecology, agricultural technology, biotechnology, genetics etc.

The needs of agriculture, concerning the past experience study of the local complex soil and next plant-atmosphere systems, lay at the root of the emergence of a new branch – agrophysics – dealing this with experimental physics.
The scope of the branch starting from soil science (physics) and originally limited to the study of relations within the soil environment, expanded over time onto influencing the properties of agricultural crops and produce as foods and raw postharvest materials, and onto the issues of quality, safety and labeling concerns, considered distinct from the field of nutrition for application in food science.

Research centres focused on the development of the agrophysical sciences include the Institute of Agrophysics, Polish Academy of Sciences in Lublin, and the Agrophysical Research Institute, Russian Academy of Sciences in St. Petersburg.

See also
Agriculture science
Agroecology
Genomics 
Metagenomics 
Metabolomics
Physics (Aristotle) 
Proteomics 
Soil plant atmosphere continuum

Research institutes and societies
 Agrophysical Research Institute in St. Petersburg, Russia
 Bohdan Dobrzański Institute of Agrophysics in Lublin, Poland
 The Indian Society of AgroPhysics

Scholarly journals
 Acta Agrophysica
 Journal of Agricultural Physics
 Polish Journal of Soil Science

References
Encyclopedia of Agrophysics in series: Encyclopedia of Earth Sciences Series edts. Jan Glinski, Jozef Horabik, Jerzy Lipiec, 2011, Publisher: Springer, 
Encyclopedia of Soil Science, edts. Ward Chesworth, 2008, Uniw. of Guelph Canada, Publ. Springer, 
АГРОФИЗИКА - AGROPHYSICS by Е. В. Шеин (J.W. Chein), В. М. Гончаров (W.M. Gontcharow), Ростов-на-Дону (Rostov-on-Don), Феникс (Phoenix), 2006, - 399 c.,  - Рекомендовано УМО по классическому университетскому образованию в качестве учебника для студентов высших учебных заведений, обучающихся по специальности и направлению высшего профессионального образования "Почвоведение"
Scientific Dictionary of Agrophysics: polish-English, polsko-angielski by R. Dębicki, J. Gliński, J. Horabik, R. T. Walczak - Lublin 2004, 
Physical Methods in Agriculture. Approach to Precision and Quality, edts. J. Blahovec and M. Kutilek, Kluwer Academic Publishers, New York 2002, .
Soil Physical Condition and Plant Roots by J. Gliński, J. Lipiec, 1990, CRC Press, Inc., Boca Raton, USA, 
Soil Aeration and its Role for Plants by J. Gliński, W. Stępniewski, 1985, Publisher: CRC Press, Inc., Boca Raton, USA, 
Fundamentals of Agrophysics (Osnovy agrofiziki) by A. F. Ioffe, I. B. Revut, Petr Basilevich Vershinin, 1966, English : Publisher: Jerusalem, Israel Program for Scientific Translations; (available from the U.S. Dept. of Commerce, Clearinghouse for Federal Scientific and Technical Information, Va.)
Fundamentals of Agrophysics by P. V, etc. Vershinin, 1959, Publisher: IPST,

External links
Agrophysical Research Institute of the Russian Academy of Agricultural Sciences
Bohdan Dobrzański Institute of Agrophysics, Polish Academy of Sciences in Lublin
Free Association of PMA Labs, Czech University of Agriculture, Prague
International Agrophysics
International Agrophysics - quarterly journal focused on applications of physics in environmental and agricultural sciences
Polish Society of Agrophysics
Sustainable Agriculture: Definitions and Terms

Agronomy
Applied and interdisciplinary physics